Abate is a surname of Italian origin. Notable people with the surname include the following:

 Abiyote Abate (born 1980), Ethiopian long-distance runner
 Adamo Abate (990–c. 1060), Italian medieval Benedictine abbot
 Atnafu Abate (1931–1977), Ethiopian military officer and politician
 Beniamino Abate (born 1962), Italian football (soccer) goalkeeper
 Bob Abate (1893–1981), Canadian sports coach
 Carlo Maria Abate (1932-2019), Italian auto racing driver
 Carmine Abate (born 1954), Italian writer
 Catherine M. Abate (1947–2014), New York State Senator
 Emanuele Abate (born 1985), Italian athlete
 Getachew Abate (1895–1952), army commander and a member of the royalty of the Ethiopian Empire
 Giovanni Abate (born 1981), Italian footballer
 Greg Abate (born 1947), American jazz saxophonist, flautist, composer, and arranger
 Ignazio Abate (born 1986), Italian football (soccer) right back/midfielder
 Joseph Abate (1902–1994), American mobster
 Leul Abate (born 1954), Ethiopian airline pilot and victim of three hijackings
 Loris Abate (1928–2020), Italian jewelry designer and businessman
 Marco Abate (born 1962), Italian mathematician
 Mulugeta Abate, Ethiopian musician
 Rosa Silvana Abate (born 1963), Italian politician
 Thomas Abate (born 1978), American musician

See also 
 Abbate

References 

Italian-language surnames